Luca Steinfeldt (born 28 September 1996) is a German footballer who plays as a forward for Preußen Münster II.

References

1996 births
Sportspeople from Münster
Footballers from North Rhine-Westphalia
Living people
German footballers
Association football forwards
MSV Duisburg II players
SC Preußen Münster players
TuS Haltern players
Rot Weiss Ahlen players
SV Lippstadt 08 players
3. Liga players
Regionalliga players
Oberliga (football) players